Ivan Lendl successfully defended his title, by defeating Boris Becker 6–7, 6–3, 4–6, 6–4, 6–4 in the final.

Seeds

Draw

Finals

Top half

Bottom half

References

External links
 Official results archive (ATP)
 Official results archive (ITF)

Wembley Championships
1985 Grand Prix (tennis)